A Girl's Night Out was a series of charity concerts by Barbadian singer Rihanna to benefit the "Believe Foundation". The concerts were made free for the public. Money from sponsors and advertisers were to be donated to provide medical supplies, school supplies and toys to children in need.

Set list
 "Pon de Replay"
 "Let Me"
 "Rehab"
 "SOS"
 "Good Girl Gone Bad"
 "Hate That I Love You"
 "Unfaithful"
 "Don't Stop The Music"
 "Shut Up and Drive"
 "Umbrella"

Tour dates

References

External links
Rihanna's Official website
The Believe Foundation

2008 concert tours
Rihanna concert tours